Luxon may refer to:

 An obsolete synonym for the troland, a unit of conventional retinal illuminance
 Luxon or a massless particle, a particle traveling at the speed of light
 Benjamin Luxon (born 1937), British baritone
 Christopher Luxon (born 1970), New Zealand politician and airline executive